Gaither House is a historic home located near Harmony, Iredell County, North Carolina.  It was built about 1850, and is a two-story, three bay by three bay, vernacular Greek Revival style frame dwelling.  It has a gable roof and features a hipped roof entrance portico with fluted Doric order columns.

It was added to the National Register of Historic Places in 1980.

References

Houses on the National Register of Historic Places in North Carolina
Greek Revival houses in North Carolina
Houses completed in 1850
Houses in Iredell County, North Carolina
National Register of Historic Places in Iredell County, North Carolina